Ryan Tveter (born May 20, 1994) is an American racing driver from Oyster Bay, New York, who raced for Trident in the 2019 FIA Formula 2 Championship.

Career

2019
Tveter made his debut in the FIA Formula 2 championship as a replacement driver for the Austrian round under the Trident Racing Team. Tveter was classified 27th for the final 2019 FIA Formula 2 Championship standings.

2017
Tveter made his debut in the GP3 Series after being named as one of Trident's full-season drivers for the 2017 season.

2016
Tveter caused one of the heaviest crashes in motorsport during the FIA Formula 3 European Championship race in Spielberg. Tveter's spin caused a cloud of dust, in which driver Peter Li Zhi Cong lost visibility. Peter Li Zhi Cong collided with Tveter's stalled car and was catapulted into the air.

Racing record

Career summary

† As he was a guest driver, Tveter was ineligible to score points.

Complete Star Mazda Championship results

Complete Eurocup Formula Renault 2.0 results
(key) (Races in bold indicate pole position) (Races in italics indicate fastest lap)

Complete FIA Formula 3 European Championship results
(key) (Races in bold indicate pole position) (Races in italics indicate fastest lap)

Complete GP3 Series results
(key) (Races in bold indicate pole position) (Races in italics indicate fastest lap)

Complete FIA Formula 2 Championship results
(key) (Races in bold indicate pole position) (Races in italics indicate points for the fastest lap of top ten finishers)

References

External links
  
 

Living people
Racing drivers from New York (state)
FIA Formula 2 Championship drivers
FIA Formula 3 European Championship drivers
Toyota Racing Series drivers
American GP3 Series drivers
U.S. F2000 National Championship drivers
1994 births
Formula Renault Eurocup drivers
Carlin racing drivers
Formula Renault 2.0 NEC drivers
Team Pelfrey drivers
Fortec Motorsport drivers
Josef Kaufmann Racing drivers
Trident Racing drivers
Team West-Tec drivers